Polysporina is a genus of lichenized fungi in the family Acarosporaceae.

Citations

References 

 

Acarosporales
Lecanoromycetes genera
Lichen genera